The Netherlands' mainstream video games market, not taking into consideration the serious and casual games, is the sixth largest in Europe. In 2008, the Dutch market took up 3.95% of the entire European market in total sales and 4.19% in software sales.

A significant part of the Netherlands' gaming industry is in serious games, in which Dutch companies make a significant part of the worldwide industry.

In the Netherlands, an estimated of 4,000 people are working in the games industry, at more than 600 companies. Over 45 of the companies are located in the Dutch Game Garden, a government subsidized organization with the aim of promoting and improving the video games industry in the Netherlands.

Consumer availability
In 2007, the Dutch game industry surpassed the Dutch film industry for the first time in history. The growth of the games industry in the Netherlands is about 50% higher than any other industry in the Netherlands' region.

Despite the global financial crisis of 2008–2009, the situation of video gaming in the Netherlands is not all that bad. Both publishers and retailers report that the crisis has certainly not caused a drop in sales, while at times, sales have even improved.

History
Although the first generation of video games were obtained by a select few, video games became first available during the second generation of video games, when a select few Dutch electronic stores carried the earlier systems. With the third generation, more stores started carrying video game related products, a trend that has been setting through ever since.

In the early '90s, independent video game stores first started to open in the Netherlands, with a fast expansion in the early 2000s. Since 2004, video games have gotten more important for general stores however, which has led to the closing of a number of game stores, and a merger of others.

Currently, there are about 1,200 stores, of which about 75 independent, in the Netherlands that carry video games and related items, and numerous online stores.

Distribution
Distribution of games on physical media in the Netherlands is usually done by publishers or major distributors such as Micromedia BV in Nijmegen that cover the entire Benelux, although most of the publishers' offices are located in the Netherlands, and only a few have offices in Belgium. Since not every publisher has a separate office for the Benelux, certain publishers take care of multiple labels, including those of other publishers.

The Netherlands also has several publishers for games through digital distribution, such as via web portals and mobile platforms like the App Store and Google Play.

Netherlands in video games

The Netherlands is not often used as a setting for video games, other than certain Dutch games such as A2 Racer and Efteling Tycoon. Amsterdam, the capital of the Netherlands, was planned to be a featured city in The Getaway 3, before its development was cancelled. The first internationally successful game to use the Netherlands as a setting is Hitman: Codename 47, which has a level set in Rotterdam. Resistance: Retribution also featured a level in Rotterdam. During World War II, the Netherlands was the location of Operation Market Garden, a much-used setting for World War II games. The game Brothers in Arms: Hell's Highway focusses entirely on Operation Market Garden and accurately depicts the Dutch towns and landscape along the operation's route.

In games such as the FIFA football games and Olympic video games, teams or players from the Netherlands are featured. The TT Circuit Assen is by fans considered "The Cathedral" of motorcycling, with the Dutch TT being one of the biggest events in motorbike racing. As such, the track is featured in many of the motorcycling racing games. Circuit Park Zandvoort is a Formula One racing track. The track has been featured in its old Formula One-layout in the game Grand Prix Legends, and more recently in its current layout in TOCA Race Driver, TOCA Race Driver 2, Race 07 and rFactor 2.

Recently Mario Kart Tour added an Amsterdam tour track to its roster.

Video game development

Game developers from the Netherlands

Defunct game developers

Game publishers from the Netherlands

Defunct game publishers from the Netherlands

Games developed in the Netherlands

 Killzone series
 Horizon Zero Dawn
 Age of Wonders
 Overlord
 Swords & Soldiers
 Rocket riot
 Ibb and Obb
 Toki Tori
 Tarimba & Taromba
 The Chronicles of Spellborn
 Worms: Open Warfare 2
 Bang Attack
 Delicious series
 Ship Simulator
 Adam's Venture
 Moorhuhn

Education
Up until 1998, whoever wanted to work in the gaming industry was best off pursuing a computer programming or graphic design education. In 1998, Utrecht School of the Arts offered the first 'pure' game education on the European continent. 
Currently there are 11 schools offering specific game educations in the Netherlands.

University of Amsterdam 

Since 2013 the University of Amsterdam offers the first master program focused on game development (Game studies).

Utrecht University

Utrecht University offers Game technology as a variant of its Computer Science bachelor and a master in Game & Media Technology.

Breda University of Applied Sciences

Breda University of Applied Sciences has been offering a course in game development (Creative Media and Game Technologies), for over 10 years. The 4-year course is entirely focused on practical teaching, working with a variant of Project-Based Learning called "Role-Based Learning". Students work entirely on game development projects, with an assessment based on their behavior and learning within those projects. They also offer a Master in Game Technology.

Rotterdam University of Applied Sciences

Rotterdam University of Applied Sciences offer a major in Creative Media & Game Technologies with a minor Game design and Development for example where students have to create several games within a short amount of time. First, they learn to create a 2D Android game within 6 weeks. Then they learn to create a 3D game within 13 weeks total.

Saxion University of Applied Sciences

Saxion University of Applied Science in Enschede also offers a bachelor's degree in Creative Media and Game Technologies.

Media

Print media
 Power Unlimited, since 1993 (oldest active publication)
 Control, since 2007

Defunct print media
 n3 Nintendo Magazine; 2002–2003
 GMR; 2006–2008
 gamesTM; 2008
 Hoog Spel; 1990–2002
 [N]Gamer; 2003–2012

Television and radio
 Gamekings, since 2002 (television)
 InsidegamerTV (television)

Defunct television and media
 GameVille (casual games television show)
 Gammo (defunct television show)
 Power Play (defunct television show)

Online media
 GamersNET.nl
 Insidegamer.nl
 Gamer.nl, since 1999 (oldest active online publication)
 Gamekings.tv
 Tweakers (games section)
 nl.IGN.com (Dutch)
 XGN.nl

Defunct online media
 Gamesen.nl
 Gamez.nl
 Bashers.nl

Video game systems

Philips CD-i 
The Philips CD-i (Compact Disc Interactive), first released in 1991, is an interactive multimedia CD player developed and marketed by the Dutch electronics manufacturer Royal Philips Electronics N.V. This category of device was created to provide more functionality than an audio CD player or game console, but at a lower price than a personal computer with a CD-ROM drive at the time.
Earlier CD-i games included entries in popular Nintendo franchises, such as Hotel Mario, Link: The Faces of Evil, Zelda: The Wand of Gamelon and Zelda's Adventure, although those games were not developed by Nintendo. In addition to games, a lot of educational and multimedia reference titles were produced for the system, such as interactive encyclopedias, museum tours, etc. The CD-i was a commercial failure, selling 1 million units across all manufactures in 7 years, and losing Phillips $1 billion.

Other Consoles 
 Swinxs
 Tovertafel

European video game rating
The Netherlands Institute for the Classification of Audiovisual Media (NICAM) is the institute responsible for the software given for review for the European video game content rating system PEGI.

Video game events in the Netherlands
Between 2005 and 2013, the NLGD Festival of Games was an annual trade show for the national and international video games industry, with an attendance of over 1,500 visitors in 2013.

Between 2005 and 2009, Amsterdam was the host city to Casual Connect Europe, the world's leading trade show for casual games. After a four-year absence, Amsterdam hosted Casual Connect once more in February 2014.

Over the years, there have been 2 large consumer events, until 2007 this was 'Gameplay'. From 2008 the event is organized by Blammo Events and is called Firstlook, the event is held annually in the Jaarbeurs Utrecht. Since 2015 the event has been rebranded as Firstlook Festival.

In 2013, Walibi Holland hosted the first edition of Game On, which hosted several video game activities in the theme park. Also in 2013, the Retro Game Experience was first hosted as part of the Sound and Vision experience at the Netherlands Institute for Sound and Vision. Smaller organizations and private collectors also host retro game events on a regular basis.

LAN scene
In the Netherlands, several large and smaller LAN parties and other gaming events are held yearly. In recent years, the 1000+ visitors have declined in popularity, with the scene seeing a shift towards smaller, more sociable events and/or events that offer more than just non-stop gaming. Additional activities include (outdoor) sports events, quizzes and other non-gaming competitions. In addition, small LAN-parties held at home for typically 5–15 visitors, remain popular.

A notable organization is Gameparty.net, a website that functions as a central hub in the Dutch game event scene, who also hosts two large annual events, TheParty and CampZone. Other major LAN-parties and organisations that have organized 1000+ visitor events include Drome, Netgamez, LAN = Life and Regroup. Most of these organizations operate on a non-profit basis, finding sponsors within the computer and gaming world to be able to operate budget-neutral.

References

External Links
 Dutch Game Industry Directory (Database with over 250 entries of both developers and co-developers)